This is the list of Masterpiece Theatre episodes in alphabetical order by year/season.  The list includes episodes filmed as part of The American Collection.

Episodes 
This lists the titles of the individual miniseries.  Although they occasionally only ran for one episode, many ran for as many as ten or more installments.  Some have been rebroadcast in later seasons, but the following lists them according to original season, and then in alphabetical order.

In early 2008, Masterpiece Theatre and its affiliated program Mystery! were reformatted as Masterpiece. Masterpiece is aired as three different series. Masterpiece Classic airs in the winter and early spring, Masterpiece Mystery! in the late spring and summer, and Masterpiece Contemporary in the fall.

For lists of episodes of these series, see List of Masterpiece Classic episodes, List of Masterpiece Mystery! episodes, and List of Masterpiece Contemporary episodes.

See also 
 List of Masterpiece Classic episodes
 List of Masterpiece Mystery! episodes
 List of Masterpiece Contemporary episodes
 Mystery!
 List of Mystery! episodes
 Great Performances
 Great Performances: Dance in America

External links 
 Official website

Masterpiece Theatre